Abdel Khaliq al-Rikabi is an Iraqi author. He is one of the few major Iraqi authors to have resisted emigration. He is best known for his novel Seventh Day of Creation.

References

21st-century Iraqi novelists
Living people
Year of birth missing (living people)
Place of birth missing (living people)
21st-century Iraqi writers
Iraqi male writers